The Association of Alpine States (Arge Alp) is an association of 10 states, provinces, and cantons of Austria, Germany, Italy, and Switzerland. The members are, from Austria: Salzburg, Tyrol, and Vorarlberg; from Germany: Bavaria; from Italy: Lombardy, South Tyrol, and Trentino; and from Switzerland: Graubünden, St. Gallen, and Ticino.

The association represents 23 million people within the area of about 142,000 km2. It was founded on 12 October 1972 in Mösern, near Telfs in Tyrol.

See also
 Alpine states

References

Regions of Europe
Politics of Europe
Organizations based in Europe
Alps